The House of Usher is a 1989 horror film directed by Alan Birkinshaw and starring Oliver Reed, Donald Pleasence, and Romy Walthall. It is an adaptation of The Fall of the House of Usher by Edgar Allan Poe.

Story
Molly and her fiancé Ryan travel to London to visit his uncle. On the way, Ryan swerves to miss two ghostly children who appear in the road, crashing their car. Molly runs to the estate to get help and walks into a nightmare. Ryan's uncle Roderick wants Molly for himself and has imprisoned his brother Walter in an upstairs room. Walter escapes by murdering the maid and then also murders her daughter before attacking Roderick in an attempt to end the family line. Roderick however, throws Walter from some stairs as the house catches on fire. During their fight, Molly flees and frees Ryan from his drugged stupor inside a sarcophagus, Ryan and Roderick fight as Molly flees the house. The film ends with a replay of the scene of Molly and Ryan lost trying to find his uncle's house: this time Molly suggests going back the way they came.

Cast

Release
The film has been released on blu ray by Vinegar Syndrome under their Vinegar Syndrome Archives label.

References

External links

1989 films
1989 horror films
Films based on The Fall of the House of Usher
21st Century Film Corporation films
1980s English-language films
Films directed by Alan Birkinshaw